Order 8-September is a high Macedonian distinction. It is named in honor of 8 September, the Independence Day of North Macedonia. The awards are basic stellate shape with dimensions of 81 mm. It is awarded to Heads of State, parliaments and governments, senior officials and foreign diplomats, the top officials of international organizations, and institutions for outstanding merit in establishing, developing and strengthening friendly relations and peaceful cooperation among relevant equitable states, organizations or institutions and North Macedonia, as well as for outstanding contribution to the strengthening of its international position and reputation.

Recipients
 Robert Badinter – President of the Constitutional Council of France 
 Bronisław Komorowski – President of Poland
 Viktor Orbán – Prime Minister of Hungary
 Zhelyu Zhelev – President of Bulgaria
 Roman Herzog – President of Germany
 Hamad bin Khalifa Al Thani – Emir of Qatar
 Uffe Ellemann-Jensen – Minister for Foreign Affairs of Denmark
 Nikola Kljusev – Prime Minister of North Macedonia
 Christopher R. Hill – First U.S. Ambassador to North Macedonia
 John Bitove Sr – Businessman who led movement for Independence
 Jordan Mijalkov – Minister of North Macedonia
 Miloš Zeman – President of the Czech Republic
 Olivera Nakovska-Bikova – Paralympian shooter
 Andrzej Duda – President of Poland

References

Orders, decorations, and medals of North Macedonia
Awards established in 2002